Ashwin Suryakant Dani is an Indian billionaire businessman, and the non-executive chairman of Asian Paints Ltd, India's largest paint company with operations in 16 countries. He was the vice chairman and managing director from December 1998 to March 2009. Ashwin is among the top 50 richest Indians.

Early life
Ashwin was born in Mumbai. His father Suryakant was one of the co-founders of Asian Paints. Ashwin completed his Bachelor of Science from the Institute of Science, University of Mumbai, Bachelor of Science and Technology in pigment, paints and varnish from UDCT Mumbai, master's in polymer science from University of Akron , Ohio United States and Diploma in color science from Rensselaer Polytechnic Troy, New York United States.

Ashwin's first job was in 1967 as a Development chemist with Inmont Corp (current BASF) in Detroit, US. Ashwin joined Asian Paints in 1968 as a Senior Executive and moved through successive senior positions like Director - R & D, Works Director, Whole-time Director, and Vice Chairman & MD.

At Asian Paints, Ashwin has been responsible for the development and introduction of many products for the first time in India. He pioneered the idea of Computerised Colour matching in Indian industry.

Ashwin was instrumental in setting up the 50:50 Joint Venture between Asian Paints Limited and PPG Industries, Inc, US, the world's leading manufacturer of automotive coatings and has been a member of the Board of the company from 1997, right from the inception.  The joint venture – PPG Asian Paints, is in its 21st year.

Awards

 ‘B. Krishnamurthy Award of Excellence’ by The Hyderabad Management Association and Centre for Organisational Development in September, 2017.
 ‘Businessman of the Year’ award in 2015 by Business India magazine
 Colour Society Lifetime achievement award 2012.
 ‘Ernst & Young Entrepreneur of the year’ award in the ‘Manufacturing’ category in November 2003. 
 'Cheminor Award' from the Indian Institute of Materials Management for excellence in Supply Chain in 2002.  
 ‘Achiever of the year award – chemical industry’ by the Chemtech foundation in 2003.  
 ‘Lifetime Achievement Award’ by Indian Paint Association (IPA) in 2011.

Associations

Dani is one of the two founder members of Colour Group of India, a body dedicated to the promotion of Computerised Colour Matching and Measurement of Colour by instruments and computers. Ashwin is an adviser to the Central Board of Trustees—Employees Provident Fund Government of India. He was President of the Indian Paint Association (IPA), President of the Board of Governors of the UDCT Alumni Association, Mumbai. Ashwin is also a member of the Board of Management of Institute of Chemical Technology.

Dani was till recently a member of the Board & Audit Committee of Sun Pharmaceuticals, one of the leading pharmaceutical companies in India. His tenure at Sun lasted for about 14 years from January, 2004 to September, 2018.  Ashwin is also on the Board, Chairman of Nomination & Remuneration Committee and member of Audit Committee of ACC Ltd, another leading cement company in the country since December 2011.

Dani was the President of Kapadwanj Kelavani Mandal, Kapadwanj, District Kaira, Gujarat for about 9 years from November, 2008 to June, 2017. Kapadwanj Kelavani Mandal runs an education institute right from pre-primary, primary, secondary levels up to post-graduation in science and graduation in commerce & arts streams. There are about 6,000 students in the campus.

Personal life
Dani is married to Ina Dani and has three children. His third son Malav Dani is on board of Asian Paints as non-executive director of Asian Paints.

References

Living people
Businesspeople from Mumbai
Indian industrialists
Indian billionaires
Year of birth missing (living people)
Institute of Chemical Technology alumni
Asian Paints
Indian Jains